8 Mile: Music from and Inspired by the Motion Picture is the official soundtrack to the 2002 film of the same name. The album, performed by various artists, was released on Shady Records. It spawned the hit single "Lose Yourself" by Eminem, who also stars in the semi-autobiographical movie.

The album also spawned a follow-up soundtrack, More Music from 8 Mile, consisting of songs that appear in the film and were released as singles during the film's time setting of 1995. One of the songs was performed by 2Pac, who would be the subject of a documentary with a soundtrack produced by Eminem, who also produced a posthumous album by 2Pac. The album also features four songs by Wu-Tang Clan and its members, and two songs by Mobb Deep, who eventually signed to G-Unit Records. Both albums were also made available in censored versions, removing most of the strong language and sexual and violent content.

8 Mile: Music from and Inspired by the Motion Picture debuted at number one on the  Billboard 200, selling over 700,000 copies in its first week. It sold 510,000 copies in its second week and eventually became the fifth best-selling album in the US of 2002, with sales of 3.4 million copies. It is certified quadruple platinum by the Recording Industry Association of America (RIAA). The album featured the universal number-one hit "Lose Yourself", which won the Oscar for Best Original Song.

Singles
"Lose Yourself" was released as the soundtrack's lead single on October 28, 2002. "Rap Name" was released as the soundtrack's second single six days earlier, which is October 22 of that same year. "Wanksta" was released as the soundtrack's third single on November 5. "8 Mile" was released as the soundtrack's fourth single on December 15.

Content and censorship

The clean version of the 8 Mile soundtrack removes most of the strong language and sexual and violent content. The only word left uncensored on the soundtrack, is the word "ass" (except on "Places to Go" by 50 Cent, where the word "ass" is used twice, but the word was only censored once). No other words are uncensored on the clean version of "8 Mile".

"That's My Nigga Fo' Real", by rapper Young Zee, is listed as "That's My ***** Fo' Real" on the clean version. In "Rap Game" by D12 featuring 50 Cent in Proof's verse, the word "shit" is uncensored (even on the clean version), and in Eminem's verse, the words "White House" and "Cheney" are censored on both edited and explicit versions. A very rare version of "Rap Game" can be heard on the internet, in which the words "White House" and "Cheney" are left uncensored. In "Rabbit Run" by Eminem, the word "fuck" was left uncensored once in the clean version of the soundtrack. In "Love Me" by Obie Trice, Eminem and 50 Cent, the word "goddamn" is left uncensored in 50 Cent's verse.

Critical reception

8 Mile: Music from and Inspired by the Motion Picture received generally positive reviews from critics. At Metacritic, which assigns a normalized rating out of 100 to reviews from mainstream publications, the album received an average score of 74, based on 20 reviews.

Eminem received praise from hip-hop producers and pundits for including authentic, era-appropriate beats in the film, despite the expense associated with clearance relative to original music bearing a similar sound.

Commercial performance
The album debuted at number one on the Billboard 200 with over 702,000 copies sold in the 1st week and 510,000 copies sold in the 2nd week also finishing the year as the 5th best-selling album of 2002 with US sales of over 3.4 million. As of July 2013, it has sold 4,922,000 copies in the U.S. As of January 2016, the soundtrack has sold 11 million copies worldwide.

It debuted at number one on the Canadian Albums Chart with sales of 45,000 copies. It also reached number one on the UK Compilations Chart Australian ARIAnet Albums Chart.

Track listing

8 Mile

More Music from 8 Mile

Notes
 signifies an additional producer
 signifies a co-producer

Other songs
These songs did appear in the film but were not released on any soundtrack:

"Last Dayz" by Onyx
 "Time's Up" by O.C.
 "Unbelievable" by The Notorious B.I.G.
 "Sweet Home Alabama" by Lynyrd Skynyrd
 "Insane in the Brain" by Cypress Hill
 "This Is How We Do It" by Montell Jordan
 "Gang Stories" by South Central Cartel
 "Who Shot Ya?" by The Notorious B.I.G.
 "Temptations" by 2Pac
 "Next Level (Nyte Time Mix)" by Showbiz and A.G.
 "Player's Anthem" by Junior M.A.F.I.A.
 "Da Mystery of Chessboxin'" by Wu-Tang Clan

Charts

Weekly charts

Year-end charts

Decade-end chart

Notes:
A^ In the UK, compilation albums were excluded from the main album chart from January 1989. 8 Mile: Music from and Inspired by the Motion Picture was classified as a compilation album for chart purposes and peaked at #1 on the compilations chart, not the main albums chart.

Certifications and sales

References

Eminem albums
2002 soundtrack albums
Hip hop soundtracks
Interscope Records soundtracks
Shady Records soundtracks
Songs about Detroit
Albums produced by Eminem
Albums produced by Mr. Porter
Albums produced by Dante Ross
Albums produced by DJ Premier
Albums produced by Sha Money XL
Albums produced by John Gamble (record producer)
Drama film soundtracks